Garnedd Goch is a top of Craig Cwm Silyn in Snowdonia, north Wales. It is one of the peaks that forms the Nantlle Ridge. It is the third highest point.

The summit is strewn with rock debris and has a trig point and a cairn. The panorama includes the Nebo TV mast. The summit is also one of the few places from which the three castles of Criccieth, Harlech and Caernarfon can be seen.

References

Dolbenmaen
Llanllyfni
Mountains and hills of Gwynedd
Mountains and hills of Snowdonia
Hewitts of Wales
Nuttalls